Félix Torres Sánchez (born May 1, 1932, in Ponce, Puerto Rico) is a retired professional baseball player who played three seasons for the Los Angeles Angels of Major League Baseball after spending time in the Cincinnati Redlegs and Philadelphia Phillies farm systems.

The former ,  third baseman was initially signed by the Cincinnati Redlegs prior to the  season.  He played in their minor league system in 1955 and briefly in 1956, before leaving organized baseball—he returned to the Cincinnati farm system in 1960. Prior to the  season, he was acquired by the Philadelphia Phillies, but was  never called up to the major league level. After the season, on November 27, 1961, he was acquired by the Angels in the 1961 Rule 5 draft.

On April 10, 1962, Torres went 0-for-4 in his major league debut against the Chicago White Sox at Comiskey Park in Chicago, Illinois. In his third career game, a 5–0 loss to the Minnesota Twins at Dodger Stadium in Los Angeles, California, Torres earned his first career hit, a leadoff double off pitcher Jim Kaat.

In , his rookie season, the career .254 hitter hit 11 home runs and batted in 74 runs, far more than the 51 he would knock in the next season. In 127 games, he batted .259 and scored a career-high 44 runs. During the  season, Torres played in a career-high 138 games, but had his least-productive power-hitting season, launching only 4 home runs. Torres did, however, hit .261 on 121 hits, both career-high marks. Although he reached a career high in 1964 in both home runs and slugging percentage, he set career-lows in games played, runs, hits, RBIs, and batting average before eventually settling into retirement following the season.

Although he was mostly known for his playing time for the Angels, before his Major League Baseball career began, he participated in the 1960 Caribbean Series. Torres tied for the tournament lead in home runs, hitting three in the week-long competition. Torres shared the honors with fellow-Puerto Rican Herman Davis and Héctor López of Panama, who spent time in Major League Baseball during his career.

See also
 List of Major League Baseball players from Puerto Rico
 1960 Caribbean Series

References

External links

1932 births
Living people
Buffalo Bisons (minor league) players
Douglas Trojans players
Havana Sugar Kings players
Jersey City Jerseys players
Los Angeles Angels players
Major League Baseball first basemen
Major League Baseball third basemen
Major League Baseball players from Puerto Rico
Savannah Redlegs players
Seattle Angels players
Sportspeople from Ponce, Puerto Rico
Puerto Rican expatriate baseball players in Cuba